Mottisfont Bats is a  biological Site of Special Scientific Interest west of Winchester in Hampshire. It is also a Special Area of Conservation.

The site consists of woods around Mottisfont, which supports a population of the barbastelle bat which is considered by Natural England to be of national importance. The site is used by the barbastelles for breeding, roosting, commuting and feeding. It is the only known maternity roost in Hampshire and one of only six known sites in the United Kingdom as of 2002. Eight other bat species have been recorded at Mottisfont: whiskered, brown long-eared, common and soprano pipistrelles, serotine, noctule, Daubenton's and Natterer's. Mottisfont contains a mix of woodland types including hazel coppice with standards, broadleaved plantation and coniferous plantation.

References

Sites of Special Scientific Interest in Hampshire
Sites of Special Scientific Interest notified in 2003
Woodland Sites of Special Scientific Interest
Special Areas of Conservation in England